Sheila Heti (born 25 December 1976) is a Canadian writer.

Early life 
Sheila Heti was born on 25 December 1976 in Toronto, Ontario, Canada. Her parents are Hungarian Jewish immigrants. Her brother is the comedian David Heti. Her father wanted to name her after Woody Allen but her mother was vociferously opposed.

Sheila Heti attended St. Clement's School in Toronto. She then studied playwriting at the National Theatre School of Canada (leaving the program after one year), then art history and philosophy at the University of Toronto. She graduated from North Toronto Collegiate Institute in Toronto.

Heti has described the Marquis de Sade and Henry Miller as early literary influences.

Career 
Heti's writing spans a variety of genres, including plays, short fiction, and novels. She has contributed to  periodicals including Flare, London Review of Books, Brick, Open Letters, Maisonneuve, Bookforum, n+1, the Look, McSweeney's, and the New York Times. Heti's books have been published internationally, including France, Italy, Germany, Spain, The Netherlands, Sweden, and Denmark.

She formerly worked as the interviews editor at The Believer where she also conducts interviews regularly. She contributed a column on acting to Maisonneuve.

Heti is the creator of Trampoline Hall, a popular monthly lecture series based in Toronto and New York, at which people speak on subjects outside their areas of expertise. The New Yorker praised the series for "celebrating eccentricity and do-it-yourself inventiveness". It has sold out every show since its inception in December 2001.

For the early part of 2008, Heti kept a blog called The Metaphysical Poll, where she posted the sleeping dreams people were having about Barack Obama and Hillary Clinton during the 2008 primary season, which readers sent in.

Awards 
 Now Best Emerging Author 2001, 2002, 2003, 2004
 KM Hunter Artists Award, 2002
 Giller Prize shortlist, 2018

Acting and theater 
Heti was an actress as a child, and as a teenager appeared in shows directed by Hillar Liitoja, the founder and artistic director of the experimental DNA Theatre.

She appears in Margaux Williamson's 2010 film, Teenager Hamlet, and plays Lenore Doolan in Leanne Shapton's book, Important Artifacts and Personal Property from the Collection of Lenore Doolan and Harold Morris, including Books, Street Fashion, and Jewelry.

In November 2013, Jordan Tannahill directed Heti's play All Our Happy Days Are Stupid at Toronto's Videofag. It was remounted in February 2015 at The Kitchen in New York. Heti's decade-long struggle to write the play is a primary plot element in her novel How Should a Person Be?

Books

The Middle Stories
Heti's first book, The Middle Stories, a collection of thirty short stories, was published by House of Anansi in Canada in 2001 when she was twenty-four. It was subsequently published by McSweeney's in the United States in 2002. It has been translated into German, French, Spanish and Dutch.

Ticknor 
Heti's novella, Ticknor, was released in 2005. The novel's main characters are based on real people: William Hickling Prescott and George Ticknor, although the facts of their lives are altered. It was published by House of Anansi Press in Canada, Farrar, Straus & Giroux in the United States, and Éditions Phébus in France.

How Should a Person Be? 
Heti's How Should a Person Be? was published in September 2010.  She describes it as a work of constructed reality, based on recorded interviews with her friends, particularly the painter Margaux Williamson. It was published by Henry Holt in the United States in July 2012 in a slightly different edition (she has spoken in interviews about the edits she made), and the subtitle "A novel from life" was added. It was chosen by The New York Times as one of the 100 Best Books of 2012 and by James Wood of The New Yorker as one of the best books of the year. It was also included on year-end lists on Salon, The New Republic, The New York Observer, and more. In her 2007 interview with Dave Hickey for The Believer, she noted, "Increasingly I'm less interested in writing about fictional people, because it seems so tiresome to make up a fake person and put them through the paces of a fake story. I just – I can't do it."

The Chairs Are Where the People Go 
In 2011, she published The Chairs are Where the People Go, which she wrote with her friend, Misha Glouberman. The New Yorker called it "a triumph of conversational philosophy" and named it one of the Best Books of 2011.

We Need a Horse 
McSweeney's commissioned this children's book from Heti. It was illustrated by Clare Rojas.

Women in Clothes 
In Fall 2014, Heti published a non-fiction book about women's relationship to what they wear, with co-editors Leanne Shapton and Heidi Julavits. It was a crowd-sourced book, featuring the voices of 639 women from around the world. The book was published by Penguin in the US and the UK, with a German edition published in 2015 by S. Fischer, Frankfurt am Main. It spent several months on The New York Times Best Seller list.

Motherhood 

In May 2018, Heti published an autobiographical novel, Motherhood, focused on her deliberation on whether or not to have children. Initially conceived as a nonfiction work, Heti explores the emphasis society places on motherhood and how women are judged regardless of their decision: "...a woman will always be made to feel like a criminal, whatever choice she makes, however hard she tries. Mothers feel like criminals. Nonmothers do, too." The book was named as a shortlisted finalist for the 2018 Scotiabank Giller Prize.

LitHub named her novel, Motherhood, as a Favorite Book of 2018 and a New York Times Critics Pick of 2018.

Pure Colour 

Pure Colour, a new novel exploring the human condition, appeared in 2022. It was the winner of the Governor General's Award for English-language fiction at the 2022 Governor General's Awards.

Personal life 
Heti lives in Toronto.

Bibliography

Author 

 
 
The Chairs Are Where the People Go: How to Live, Work, and Play in the City, with Misha Glouberman. Farrar, Straus and Giroux. 2011. 
We Need a Horse, illustrated by Clare Rojas. McSweeny's Publishing, 2011. 
 
 
Motherhood. Henry Holt and Company. 2018. 
 Pure Colour. Knopf Canada. 2022.

Short stories 
 The Raspberry Bush
 The Poet and the Novelist as Roommates
 Mermaid in a Jar
 What Changed
 Eleanor

Essays 

 "I Didn't Like Sitting With the Rattle for Hours." The Brooklyn Rail. 2017.

Editor 

Sheila Heti, ed. The Best American Nonrequired Reading 2018. Mariner Books. 2018.

Contributor 

 Women in Clothes. Blue Rider Press. 2014.

Interviews 
 Interview with artist Frank Stella.

References

External links 

 
 
Sheila Heti Riot Grrrl Collection at the Fales Special Collections Library at NYU
 Audio interview with Bill Richardson on the CBC

Canadian women novelists
1976 births
Living people
University of Toronto alumni
National Theatre School of Canada alumni
Canadian people of Hungarian-Jewish descent
Jewish Canadian writers
Writers from Toronto
21st-century Canadian novelists
Alternative literature
Canadian women short story writers
21st-century Canadian women writers
21st-century Canadian short story writers
Governor General's Award-winning fiction writers